Drehu (also known as Dehu, Lifou, Lifu, qene drehu) is an Austronesian language mostly spoken on Lifou Island, Loyalty Islands, New Caledonia. It has about twelve-thousand fluent speakers and the status of a French regional language. This status means that pupils can take it as an optional topic for the baccalauréat in New Caledonia itself or French mainland. It has been also taught at the Institut national des langues et civilisations orientales (INALCO) in Paris since 1973 and at the University of New Caledonia  since 2000. As for other Kanak languages, Drehu is now regulated by the "Académie des langues kanak", officially founded in 2007.

There is also a respectful register in Drehu, called qene miny. In time past, this was used to speak to the chiefs (joxu). Today very few people still know and practice this language.

Phonology

Vowels

 is heard as  before nasals.

 can sometimes be  before nasals.

Consonants

Writing system
Drehu was first written in the Latin script by the Polynesian and English missionaries of the London Missionary Society during the 1840s, with the help of the natives. The first complete Bible was published in 1890. The Bible writing system didn't distinguish between the dental (written "d", "t") and the alveolar/retroflex ("dr" and "tr") consonants, which for a long time were written indifferently "d" and "t". The new writing system was created during the 1970s.

Alphabet
 A - a - [ɑ]
 B - be - [b]
 D - de - [d]
 E - e - [e]
 Ë - ë - [æ]
 G - ge - [g]
 H - ha - [h]
 I - i - [i/j]
 J - je - [ð]
 K - ka - [k] (written as c in older documents)
 L - ël - [l]
 M - ëm - [m]
 N - ën - [n]
 O - o - [o]
 Ö - ö - [ø]
 P - pe - [p]
 Q - qu - [ʍ/g]
 R - ër - [r]
 S - ës - [s]
 T - te - [t̪]
 U - u - [u]
 V - ve - [f/v]
 W - we - [w]
 X - xa - [x]
 Z - ze - [z]

Digraphs
 dj - [t͡ʃ/d͡ʒ]
 dr - [ɖ]
 hl - [l̥]
 hm - [m̥]
 hn - [n̥]
 hng, hŋ - [ŋ̊]
 hny, hñ - [ɲ̊]
 ng, ŋ - [ŋ]
 ny, ñ - [ɲ]
 sh - [sʰ]
 tr - [ʈ]

Grammar

Personal pronouns 

Singular
Eni/ni: I, me
Eö/ö: you
Nyipë/nyipëti: you (a polite form of address to a chief (joxu)or an older man)
Nyipo/nyipot(i): you (a polite form of address to an older woman)
Angeic(e): he, him, she
Nyidrë/nyidrët(i): he, him (a polite form of address to a chief (joxu)or an older man)
Nyidro/nyidrot(i): you (a polite form of address to an older woman)
Ej(e):  it
Dual
Eaho/ho: we two (exclusive)
Easho/sho (easo/so): we two (inclusive)
Epon(i)/pon(i): you two
Eahlo:  they two
Lue ej(e):  they two for things and animals
Plural
Eahun(i)/hun(i): we, us (exclusive)
Eashë/shë, easë/së: we all, all of us (inclusive)
Epun(i)/pun(i): you
Angaatr(e): they, them
Itre ej(e):  they, them (for things and animals)

Notes

Bibliography

 Le drehu, langue de Lifou (Iles Loyauté): phonologie, morphologie, syntaxe. 
 Maurice Lenormand, Dictionnaire de la langue de Lifou. Le Qene Drehu, 1999, Nouméa, Le Rocher-à-la-Voile, 533p
Tryon, Darrell T. Dehu-English dictionary. C-6, vi + 142 pages. Pacific Linguistics, The Australian National University, 1967. 
Tryon, Darrell T. English-Dehu dictionary. C-7, iv + 165 pages. Pacific Linguistics, The Australian National University, 1967. 
Tryon, Darrell T. Dehu grammar. B-7, xii + 122 pages. Pacific Linguistics, The Australian National University, 1968.

External links

Read and listen to a traditional narrative in Drehu, in trilingual version  (homepage of French CNRS-Lacito).
Database of audio recordings in Drehu (Lifu) - basic Catholic prayers

Loyalty Islands languages
Languages of New Caledonia